The 1970 Ice Hockey World Championships was the 37th edition of the Ice Hockey World Championships. 21 nations participated in three different divisions or pools:

Pool A in Stockholm, Sweden, 14–30 March 1970
Pool B in Bucharest, Romania, 24 February – 5 March 1970
Pool C in Galaţi, Romania, 13–22 February 1970

For the eighth straight year, the Soviet Union won the world championship. Originally the tournament was scheduled to be held in Montreal and Winnipeg in Canada. However, after a dispute over allowing professional players in international tournaments, the IIHF awarded the championships to other cities. The Canadian team withdrew from competing in international hockey. They would not return to international play until 1977. This tournament was also the first one to make helmets mandatory for all skaters.

Canadian departure from international hockey

Canada was scheduled to be the original host nation of Group A for the 1970 Ice Hockey World Championships, and the International Ice Hockey Federation (IIHF) had granted use of up to nine former professional players for national teams at the event. The Canada men's national ice hockey team had not won the Ice Hockey World Championships since 1961 and had never hosted the event. Hockey Canada and the Canadian Amateur Hockey Association (CAHA) saw the use of professionals as the best chance to return Canada to hockey supremacy, and were committed to event including professionals. Canadian officials were frustrated that their best players, competing in the National Hockey League (NHL), were prevented from playing while Soviet players, who were "employees" of the industrial or military organizations that fielded "amateur" teams, were allowed to compete.

International Olympic Committee president Avery Brundage objected to the use of professionals at the World Championships and stated that any national team which played against professionals would be ineligible for ice hockey at the 1972 Winter Olympics. The IIHF called an emergency meeting for January 1970 to discuss the situation. CAHA president Earl Dawson argued that national teams participating in Izvestia Trophy tournaments had played against professionals, but were still eligible for the Olympics and the same should apply to the World Championships. He also made the suggestion to consider the 1970 event an invitational tournament instead of a World Championships to avoid the wrath of the IOC, but the IIHF declined the notion. A vote was taken and five of the eight nations in the top division of the World Championships voted against the use of any professionals.

Canada perceived the situation to be a double standard in international hockey since players on European national teams were believed to be state-sponsored professionals labeled as amateurs. Dawson and the CAHA took stand against what they perceived as hypocrisy by European members of the IIHF. Dawson withdrew the Canadian national team from international competitions against European hockey teams until Canada was allowed to use its best players. Hosting of the 1970 World Championships was given to Sweden. Dawson felt that Sweden and the Soviet Union combined to sabotage the Canadian attempt to host the 1970 World Championships, because Sweden wanted to host the event and the Soviets did not want to lose the gold medal.

Instead of competing internationally at the Olympics, Canadian officials helped organize a series of games against the Soviet Union in September 1972 known as the Summit Series. These games featured a Canadian team made up exclusively of NHL professionals.

World Championship Group A (Sweden)

Poland demoted to Pool B.

 –  	6:3  (2:1, 3:1, 1:1)

14. March 1970 – Stockholm
Goalscorers:: Machač, Martinec, Suchý, Haas, Kochta, Nedomanský – Czachowski, Goralczyk,  Kacik.

 –    2:1 (0:0, 0:0, 2:1)

14. March 1970 – Stockholm
Goalscorers:: Maltsev, Petrov - Leimu.

  –   6:1 (1:0, 2:1, 3:0)

14. March 1970 – Stockholm
Goalscorers:: Stig-Göran Johansson 2, Svedberg, Sjöbrg, Stefan Karlsson, Wickberg – Bielas.

 –   9:1 (2:1, 1:0, 6:0)

15. March 1970 – Stockholm
Goalscorers:: Leimu 3, Murto 2, Ketola, Jorma Peltonen, Mononen, Vehmanen – Goralczyk.

 –   12:1 (3:0, 3:1, 6:0)

15. March 1970 – Stockholm
Goalscorers:: Maltsev 4, Mišakov 3, Firsov, Vikulov, Charlamov, Staršinov, Petrov – Joachim Ziesche.

 – 	4:5   (2:2, 1:1, 1:2)

15. March 1970 – Stockholm
Goalscorers:: Suchý 2, Machač, Kochta – N. Johansson, Abrahamsson, Nilsson, S. G. Johansson, Hedberg.
Referees: Sillankorva (FIN), Karandin (URS)

 –   1:0 (1:0, 0:0, 0:0)

16. March 1970 – Stockholm
Goalscorer: Jorma Peltonen.

 – 	4:1  (2:0, 0:0, 2:1)

17. March 1970 – Stockholm
Goalscorers:: Haas 2, Nedomanský, Suchý – Karrenbauer.

 –   7:0 (2:0, 5:0, 0:0)

17. March 1970 – Stockholm
Goalscorers::  Vikulov 3, Maltsev 2, Michajlov, Firsov.

 –   1:3 (0:2, 1:1, 0:0)

17. March 1970 – Stockholm
Goalscorers:: Stefan Karlsson – Linnonmaa, Rantasila, Keinonen.

 – 	1:3   (0:1, 1:0, 0:2)

18. March 1970 – Stockholm
Goalscorers:: Kochta – Maltsev, Vikulov, Nikitin.
Referees: Dahlberg (SWE), Sillankorva (FIN)

 –   11:0 (4:0, 2:0, 5:0)

19. March 1970 – Stockholm
Goalscorers:: Hans Lindberg 3, Palmqvist 2, Tord Lundström 2, Abrahamsson, Stefan Karlsson, Sterner,  Lars-Göran Nilsson.

 –  	9:1  (1:0, 5:1, 3:0)

20. March 1970 – Stockholm
Goalscorers:: Suchý 3, Nedomanský 3, Ševčík, Jar. Holík, Haas – Keinonen.

 –  4:2 (1:1, 2:0, 1:1)

20. March 1970 – Stockholm
Goalscorers:: Arne Carlsson, Lundström, Palmqvist, Lars-Göran Nilsson - Charlamov,  Staršinov.

 –   2:2 (1:0, 1:1, 0:1)

21. March 1970 – Stockholm
Goalscorers:: Helmut Novy, Noack - Migacz, Bialynicki.

 –   16:1 (5:0, 8:0, 3:1)

22. March 1970 – Stockholm
Goalscorers:: Michajlov 3, Charlamov 3, Maltsev 2,  Alexandr Jakušev 2, Firsov 2, Petrov, Vikulov, Polupanov, Staršinov - Keinonen.

 – 	10:2  (5:0, 2:2, 3:0)

22. March 1970 – Stockholm
Goalscorers:: Martinec 2, Jiří Holík 2, Nedomanský, Haas, Ševčík, Pospíšil, Suchý, Jar. Holík – Bialynicki 2.

 -   6:2 (1:1, 3:1, 2:0)

23. March 1970 – Stockholm
Goalscorers:: Lars-Göran Nilsson 2, Stefan Karlsson, Lundström, Lindberg, Hedberg - Dietmar Peters, Plotka.

 –  7:1 (4:0, 0:1, 3:0)

24. March 1970 – Stockholm
Goalscorers:: Michajlov, Charlamov, Firsov, Staršinov, Alexandr Jakušev, Mišakov 2 - Slapke.

 –    4:0 (1:0, 2:0, 1:0)

24. March 1970 – Stockholm
Goalscorers:: Murto 2, Oksanen, Ketola.

 –  	2:2   (0:1, 1:0, 1:1)

24. March 1970 – Stockholm
Goalscorers:: Prýl, Hrbatý – Palmqvist, S. G. Johansson.
Referees: Karandin (URS), Wycisk (POL)

 – 	7:3  (3:0, 1:1, 3:2)

25. March 1970 – Stockholm
Goalscorers:: Nedomanský 3, Jiří Holík 2, Ševčík, Pospíšil – Joachim Ziesche, Bielas,  Fuchs.

 –   11:0 (3:0, 6:0, 2:0)

25. March 1970 – Stockholm
Goalscorers:: Maltsev 4, Michajlov 2, Polupanov 2, Charlamov, Mišakov, Šadrin.

 –   4:3 (1:0, 0:2, 3:1)

26. March 1970 – Stockholm
Goalscorers:: Stefan Karlsson 2, Wickberg, Stig-Göran Johansson - Linnonmaa, Leimu,  Mononen.

 – 	1:5   (0:2, 0:2, 1:1)

27. March 1970 – Stockholm
Goalscorers:: Hrbatý – Vikulov 2, Staršinov, Petrov, Firsov.
Referees: Sillankorva (FIN), Wycisk (POL)

 –  4:3 (1:0, 0:3, 3:0)

28. March 1970 – Stockholm
Goalscorers:: Dietmar Peters, Prusa, Joachim Ziesche, Braun - Mononen, Oksanen, Ketola.

 –   5:1 (4:0, 1:0, 0:1)

28. March 1970 – Stockholm
Goalscorers:: Olsson 2, Abrahamsson, Wickberg, Lundström – Migacz.

 –   5:2 (1:1, 0:1, 4:0)

28. March 1970 – Stockholm
Goalscorers:: Prusa, Nickel, Plotka, Hiller 2 - Bialynicki,  Goralczyk.

 –  	3:5  (0:2, 2:2, 1:1)

30. March 1970 – Stockholm
Goalscorers:: Nedomanský, Ševčík, R. Farda – Keinonen, Ketola, Murto, Rantasila, Jorma Peltonen.

 –  1:3 (0:0, 1:2, 0:1)

30. March 1970 – Stockholm
Goalscorers:: Wickberg - Vikulov, Petrov, Maltsev.

Pool A Statistics and Team Line-Ups

All Stars

Team Rosters

1.  USSR
Goaltenders: Viktor Konovalenko, Vladislav Treťjak.
Defencemen: Vitalij Davidov, Valerij Vasiljev,  Alexander Ragulin, Vladimir Lutčenko, Igor Romiševskij, Jevgenij Paladjev, Valerij Nikitin.
Forwards: Boris Michajlov, Vladimir Petrov, Valerij Charlamov, Vladimir Vikulov, Viktor Populanov, Anatoli Firsov, Alexander Maltsev, Vjačeslav Staršinov, Jevgenij Mišakov, Alexandr Jakušev, Vladimir Šadrin, Vladimir Šapovalov.
Coaches: Arkadij Černyšev, Anatolij Tarasov.

2.  SWEDEN
Goaltenders: Leif Holmqvist, Gunnar Bäckman.
Defencemen:  Thommy Abrahamsson, Arne Carlsson, Anders Hagström, Nils Johansson,  Kjell-Rune Milton, Lars-Erik Sjöberg, Lennart Svedberg.
Forwards: Anders Hedberg, Stig-Göran Johansson, Stefan Karlsson, Hans Lindberg, Tord Lundström, Lars-Göran Nilsson, Anders Nordin, Roger Olsson, Björn Palmqvist, Ulf Sterner, Håkan Wickberg.
Coach: Arne Strömberg.

3.  CZECHOSLOVAKIA
Goaltenders: Vladimír Dzurilla, Miroslav Lacký.
Defencemen: Jan Suchý, Josef Horešovský, Oldřich Machač, František Pospíšil, Vladimír Bednář, Lubomír Ujváry.
Forwards: Vladimír Martinec, Richard Farda, Josef Černý, Jan Hrbatý, Jaroslav Holík, Jiří Holík, Július Haas, Václav Nedomanský, Jiří Kochta, František Ševčík, Ivan Hlinka, Stanislav Prýl.
Coaches: Jaroslav Pitner, Vladimír Kostka.

4.   FINLAND
Goaltenders: Urpo Ylönen, Jorma Valtonen.
Defencemen and Forwards: Seppo Lindström, Ilpo Koskela, Juha Rantasila, Heikki Riihiranta, Pekka Marjamäki, Lalli Partinen, Pekka Leimu, Jorma Peltonen, Lasse Oksanen, Jorma Vehmanen, Veli-Pekka Ketola, Matti Keinonen, Väinö Kalkka, Matti Murto, Esa Peltonen, Juhani Tamminen, Harri  Linnonmaa, Lauri Mononen.
Coaches: Seppo Liitsola, Matias Helenius.

5.    EAST GERMANY
Goaltenders: Claus Hirsche, Dieter Pürschel.
Defencemen and Forwards: Dietmar Peters, Frank Braun, Wolfgang Plotka, Peter Slapke, Bernd Karrenbauer, Dieter Dewitz, Rüdiger Noack, Hartmut Nickel, Joachim Ziesche, Wilfried Rohrbach, Rainer Patschinski, Bernd Hiller, Lothar Fuchs, Reinhard Karger, Dieter Röhl, Helmut Nowy, Rolf Bielas, Peter Prusa.
Coach: Rudi Schmiede.

6.    POLAND
Goaltenders: Walery Kosyl, Andrzej Tkacz.
Defencemen and Forwards: Andrzej Slowakiewicz, Ludwik Czachowski, Robert Goralczyk, Marian Feter, Walenty Zietara, J. Stefaniak, Tadeusz Kacik, M. Kajzerek, K. Bialynicki, Tadeusz Obloj, Wlodzimirz Komorski, Feliks Goralzcyk, Bogdan Migacz, J. Modzelewski, St. Szewczyk, Czyslaw Ruchala, Mieczyslaw Jaskierski, Tadeusz Malicki, Stanislaw Fryzlewicz.
Coach:  A. Jegorov.

World Championship Group B (Romania)

The USA was promoted to Pool A while Romania and Bulgaria were demoted to Pool C.

All Stars

 –   3:6 (1:1, 1:2, 1:3)

24. February 1970 – Bucharest

 –   11:1 (4:1, 3:0, 4:0)

24. February 1970 – Bucharest

 -   4:2 (2:1, 1:0, 1:1)

24. February 1970 – Bucharest

  -    4:3 (2:0, 2:0, 0:3)

24. February 1970 – Bucharest

 -   19:1 (6:1, 7:0, 6:0)

25. February 1970 – Bucharest

 –   2:1 (1:0, 0:0, 1:1)

25. February 1970 – Bucharest

 –   4:2 (2:1, 1:1, 1:0)

26. February 1970 – Bucharest

 –   3:4 (0:0, 1:1, 2:3)

26. February 1970 – Bucharest

 –    8:3 (4:0, 2:2, 2:1)

27. February 1970 – Bucharest

 –  5:1 (2:0, 1:1, 2:0)

27. February 1970 – Bucharest

 –   3:1 (0:0, 3:0, 0:1)

27. February 1970 – Bucharest

  –   4:8 (0:2, 4:1, 0:5)

27. February 1970 – Bucharest

 –   5:2 (0:1, 3:1, 2:0)

28. February 1970 – Bucharest

  –    11:2 (3:1, 4:1, 4:0)

28. February 1970 – Bucharest

 -   3:3 (2:0, 0:1, 1:2)

1. March 1970 - Bucharest

  -   1:7 (0:3, 0:1, 1:3)

1. March 1970 - Bucharest

 -    13:1 (5:0, 7:0, 1:1)

2. March 1970 - Bucharest

 –   6:3 (2:0, 2:2, 2:1)

2. March 1970 - Bucharest

  –   5:5 (2:1, 1:1, 2:3)

2. March 1970 - Bucharest

 –   9:1 (4:1, 1:0, 4:0)

2. March 1970 – Bucharest

 –   9:2 (4:0, 2:1, 3:1)

4. March 1970 – Bucharest

 –   6:0 (1:0, 5:0, 0:0)

4. March 1970 – Bucharest

   –   3:2 (2:0, 0:2, 1:0)

4. March 1970 – Bucharest

 –   5:2 (0:1, 1:0, 4:1)

4. March 1970 – Bucharest

 –    8:2 (6:1, 2:0, 0:1)

5. March 1970 – Bucharest

 –   12:3 (2:1, 6:1, 4:1)

5. March 1970 – Bucharest

 –   3:0 (0:0, 3:0, 0:0)

5. March 1970 – Bucharest

 –  6:2 (2:0, 2:0, 2:2)

5. March 1970 – Bucharest

World Championship Group C (Romania)

Austria and Italy promoted to Pool-B tournament.

 –   3:1 (0:0, 0:0, 3:1)

13. February 1970 – Galati

 –   7:2 (1:0, 2:2, 4:0)

13. February 1970 – Galati

 –    7:1 (1:1, 3:0, 3:0)

13. February 1970 – Galati

   –   2:9 (0:6, 0:2, 2:1)

14. February 1970 – Galati

 –   8:2 (1:2, 5:0, 2:0)

14. February 1970 – Galati

 –  4:3 (2:3, 2:0, 0:0)

15. February 1970 – Galati

   –    7:1 (1:1, 4:0, 2:0)

16. February 1970 – Galati

 –   4:1 (0:1, 2:0, 2:0)

16. February 1970 – Galati

 –   3:2 (3:1, 0:0, 0:1)

16. February 1970 – Galati

 –    11:0 (3:0, 3:0, 5:0)

18. February 1970 – Galati

   –   3:3 (0:0, 1:2, 2:1)

18. February 1970 – Galati

 –   3:6 (1:3, 0:1, 2:2)

18. February 1970 – Galati

  –   11:4 (4:1, 2:1, 5:2)

19. February 1970 – Galati

  –   2:4 (0:2, 1:0, 1:2)

19. February 1970 – Galati

 –    6:1 (3:0, 2:1, 1:0)

19. February 1970 – Galati

 –    9:2 (3:1, 4:0, 2:1)

21. February 1970 – Galati

  –    15:2 (5:1, 3:0, 7:1)

21. February 1970 – Galati

  –   0:2 (0:0, 0:1, 0:1)

21. February 1970 – Galati

  –   11:0 (4:0, 2:0, 5:0)

22. February 1970 – Galati

  –   6:2 (4:2, 1:0, 1:0)

22. February 1970 – Galati

 –   3:3 (2:3, 0:0, 1:0)

22. February 1970 – Galati

Ranking and statistics

Tournament Awards
Best players selected by the directorate:
Best Goaltender:       Urpo Ylönen
Best Defenceman:       Lennart Svedberg
Best Forward:          Alexander Maltsev
Media All-Star Team:
Goaltender:  Viktor Konovalenko
Defence:  Jan Suchý,  Lennart Svedberg
Forwards:  Anatoli Firsov,  Alexander Maltsev,  Václav Nedomanský

Final standings
The final standings of the tournament according to IIHF:

European championships final standings
The final standings of the European championships according to IIHF:

References

Bibliography
 
 
Summary (in french)

External links
IIHF World Ice Hockey Championships at SVT's open archive 

IIHF Men's World Ice Hockey Championships
World Championships
1970
International sports competitions in Stockholm
1970s in Stockholm
Ice Hockey World Championships
Ice Hockey World Championships
Sport in Galați
1970s in Bucharest
Sports competitions in Bucharest
World Championships
International ice hockey competitions hosted by Romania